Khanty (also spelled Khanti or Hanti), previously known as Ostyak, is an Uralic language spoken in the Khanty-Mansi and Yamalo-Nenets Okrugs. There were thought to be around 7500 speakers of Northern Khanty and 2000 speakers of Eastern Khanty in 2010, with Southern Khanty being likely extinct, however the total amount of speakers in the most recent census was around 13900.

The Khanty language has many dialects. The western group includes the Obdorian, Ob, and Irtysh dialects. The eastern group includes the Surgut and Vakh-Vasyugan dialects, which, in turn, are subdivided into thirteen other dialects. All these dialects differ significantly from each other by phonetic, morphological, and lexical features to the extent that the three main "dialects" (northern, southern and eastern) are mutually unintelligible. Thus, based on their significant multifactorial differences, Eastern, Northern and Southern Khanty could be considered separate but closely related languages.

Alphabet
Cyrillic

Palatalised consonants are designated by either ь or a yotated character.

Literary language

The Khanty written language was first created after the October Revolution on the basis of the Latin script in 1930 and then with the Cyrillic alphabet (with the additional letter  for ) from 1937.

Khanty literary works are usually written in three Northern dialects, Kazym, Shuryshkar, and Middle Ob. Newspaper reporting and broadcasting are usually done in the Kazymian dialect.

Varieties

Khanty is divided in three main dialect groups, which are to a large degree mutually unintelligible, and therefore best considered three languages: Northern, Southern and Eastern. Individual dialects are named after the rivers they are or were spoken on. Southern Khanty is probably extinct by now.
Eastern Khanty
Far Eastern (Vakh, Vasjugan, Verkhne-Kalimsk, Vartovskoe)
Surgut (Jugan, Malij Jugan, Pim, Likrisovskoe, Tremjugan, Tromagan)
transitional: Salym
Western Khanty
Northern Khanty
 Obdorsk
 Berjozov (Synja, Muzhi, Shuryshkar), Kazym, Sherkal
 transitional: Atlym, Nizyam
Southern Khanty: Upper Demjanka, Lower Demjanka, Konda, Cingali, Krasnojarsk
The Salym dialect can be classified as transitional between Eastern and Southern (Honti:1998 suggests closer affinity with Eastern, Abondolo:1998 in the same work with Southern). The Atlym and Nizyam dialects also show some Southern features.

Southern and Northern Khanty share various innovations and can be grouped together as Western Khanty. These include loss of full front rounded vowels: *üü, *öö, *ɔ̈ɔ̈ > *ii, *ee, *ää (but *ɔ̈ɔ̈ > *oo adjacent to *k, *ŋ), loss of vowel harmony, fricativization of *k to /x/ adjacent to back vowels, and the loss of the *ɣ phoneme.

Phonology
A general feature of all Khanty varieties is that while long vowels are not distinguished, a contrast between plain vowels (e.g. ) vs. reduced or extra-short vowels (e.g. ) is found. This corresponds to an actual length distinction in Khanty's close relative Mansi. According to scholars who posit a common Ob-Ugric ancestry for the two, this was also the original Proto-Ob-Ugric situation.

Palatalization of consonants is phonemic in Khanty, as in most other Uralic languages. Retroflex consonants are also found in most varieties of Khanty.

Khanty word stress is usually on the initial syllable.

Proto-Khanty

19 consonants are reconstructed for Proto-Khanty, listed with the traditional UPA transcription shown above and an IPA transcription shown below.

A major consonant isogloss among the Khanty varieties is the reflexation of the lateral consonants, *ɬ (from Proto-Uralic *s and *š) and *l (from Proto-Uralic *l and *ð). These generally merge, however with varying results: /l/ in the Obdorsk and Far Eastern dialects, /ɬ/ in the Kazym and Surgut dialects, and /t/ elsewhere. The Vasjugan dialect still retains the distinction word-initially, having instead shifted *ɬ > /j/ in this position. Similarly, the palatalized lateral *ľ developed to /lʲ/ in Far Eastern and Obdorsk, /ɬʲ/ in Kazym and Surgut, and /tʲ/ elsewhere. The retroflex lateral *ḷ remains in Far Eastern, but in /t/-dialects develops into a new plain /l/.

Other dialect isoglosses include the development of original *ć to a palatalized stop /tʲ/ in Eastern and Southern Khanty, but to a palatalized sibilant /sʲ ~ ɕ/ in Northern, and the development of original *č similarly to a sibilant /ʂ/ in Northern Khanty, partly also in Southern Khanty.

Eastern Khanty

Far Eastern
The Vakh dialect is divergent. It has rigid vowel harmony and a tripartite (ergative–accusative) case system: The subject of a transitive verb takes the instrumental case suffix -nə-, while the object takes the accusative case suffix. The subject of an intransitive verb, however, is not marked for case and might be said to be absolutive. The transitive verb agrees with the subject, as in nominative–accusative systems.

Vakh has the richest vowel inventory, with five reduced vowels  and full . Some researchers also report .

Surgut

Northern Khanty
The Kazym dialect distinguishes 18 consonants.

The vowel inventory is much simpler. Eight vowels are distinguished in initial syllables: six full  and four reduced . In unstressed syllables, four values are found: .

A similarly simple vowel inventory is found in the Nizyam, Sherkal, and Berjozov dialects, which have full  and reduced . Aside from the full vs. reduced contrast rather than one of length, this is identical to that of the adjacent Sosva dialect of Mansi.

The Obdorsk dialect has retained full close vowels and has a nine-vowel system: full vowels  and reduced vowels ). It however has a simpler consonant inventory, having the lateral approximants /l lʲ/ in place of the fricatives /ɬ ɬʲ/ and having fronted   to /s n/.

Grammar

The noun
The nominal suffixes include dual , plural , dative , locative/instrumental .

For example:
xot "house" (cf. Finnish koti "home")
xotŋəna "to the two houses"
xotətnə "at the houses" (cf. Hungarian otthon, Finnish kotona "at home", an exceptional form using the old, locative meaning of the essive case ending -na).

Singular, dual, and plural possessive suffixes may be added to singular, dual, and plural nouns, in three persons, for 33 = 27 forms. A few, from məs "cow", are:
məsem "my cow"
məsemən "my 2 cows"
məsew "my cows"
məstatən "the 2 of our cows"
məsŋətuw "our 2 cows"

Pronouns
The personal pronouns are, in the nominative case:

The cases of ma are accusative manət and dative manəm.

The demonstrative pronouns and adjectives are:
tamə "this", tomə "that", sit "that yonder": tam xot "this house".

Basic interrogative pronouns are:
xoy "who?", muy "what?"

Numerals
Khanty numerals, compared with Hungarian and Finnish, are:

The formation of multiples of ten shows Slavic influence in Khanty, whereas Hungarian uses the collective derivative suffix -van (-ven) closely related to the suffix of the adverbial participle which is -va (-ve) today but used to be -ván (-vén). Note also the regularity of  "house" and  "hundred".

Syntax
Both Khanty and Mansi are basically nominative–accusative languages but have innovative morphological ergativity. In an ergative construction, the object is given the same case as the subject of an intransitive verb, and the locative is used for the agent of the transitive verb (as an instrumental) . This may be used with some specific verbs, for example "to give": the literal Anglicisation would be "by me (subject) a fish (object) gave to you (indirect object)" for the equivalent of the sentence "I gave you a fish". However, the ergative is only morphological (marked using a case) and not syntactic, so that, in addition, these may be passivized in a way resembling English. For example, in Mansi, "a dog (agent) bit you (object)" could be reformatted as "you (object) were bitten, by a dog (instrument)".

Khanty is an agglutinative language and employs an SOV order.

Lexicon
The lexicon of the Khanty varieties is documented relatively well. The most extensive early source is Toivonen (1948), based on field records by K. F. Karjalainen from 1898 to 1901. An etymological interdialectal dictionary, covering all known material from pre-1940 sources, is Steinitz et al. (1966–1993).

Schiefer (1972) summarizes the etymological sources of Khanty vocabulary, as per Steinitz et al., as follows:

Futaky (1975) additionally proposes a number of loanwords from the Tungusic languages, mainly Evenki.

Notes

References

External links

Khanty Language
Omniglot
Documentation of Eastern Khanty
 Khanty basic lexicon at the Global Lexicostatistical Database
Khanty Language and People
Khanty–Russian Russian–Khanty dictionary (download), mirror (in case the PDF link gets misdirected)
Khanty Bibliographical Guide
OLAC resources in and about the Khanty language

 
Languages of Russia
Uralic languages
Vowel-harmony languages
Khanty-Mansi Autonomous Okrug
Yamalo-Nenets Autonomous Okrug
Subject–object–verb languages
Agglutinative languages